The 2022 Mont Ventoux Dénivelé Challenge was the fourth edition of the Mont Ventoux Dénivelé Challenge road cycling one-day race, which was a category 1.1 event on the 2022 UCI Europe Tour.

Teams 
Six UCI WorldTeams, seven UCI ProTeams, and five UCI Continental teams made up the eighteen teams that participated in the race.

UCI WorldTeams

 
 
 
 
 
 

UCI ProTeams

 
 
 
 
 
 
 

UCI Continental Teams

Result

References 

2022
Mont Ventoux Dénivelé Challenge
Mont Ventoux Dénivelé Challenge
Mont Ventoux Dénivelé Challenge